Stony Cut, Cold Hesledon is a Site of Special Scientific Interest in the Easington district of north-east County Durham, England. It consists of a shallow cutting alongside Seaham Golf Course close to the village of Cold Hesledon.

The cutting exposes a section of Late Permian Ford Formation (Zechstein) dolomite in which the transition from the flat to the crest of the shelf-edge of an ancient reef is clearly visible. The site has been designated as of national importance in the Geological Conservation Review.

References

Sites of Special Scientific Interest in County Durham